It's All Relative is an American sitcom that aired on ABC from October 1, 2003, until April 20, 2004. The series is about two families in Boston – one lower-class Irish Catholic and the other an upper-class WASP household headed by a gay couple – who are reluctantly joined together when their kids get engaged.

Overview 
The story revolved around two polar opposite families, who lived in Boston, Massachusetts, that are forced to come together with their kids' engagement.

In one corner, there was the working-class O'Neill family, led by Mace (Lenny Clarke), the rather stereotypical Boston Irish bar owner of Paddy's, with his wife, traditional middle-aged housewife Audrey (Harriet Sansom Harris), and two kids, Bobby (Reid Scott) and Maddy (Paige Moss).

On the other side, there was the upper-class Stoddard-Banks family, with Simon (Christopher Sieber) and Philip (John Benjamin Hickey), a same-sex couple who takes pride in how well they were able to raise their adoptive daughter, Liz (Maggie Lawson).

These two polar opposite families collide when it is revealed Bobby and Liz have been secretly dating each other, and are now engaged. Both sides are against any relationship their child has with the other, let alone a marriage. Homophobic Mace and Stuck-up Philip especially drive the arguments between both of the families, with their very vocal disapproval of not only the engagement, but each other. Bobby and Liz move into Simon and Philip's guest house, and the families are now forced to come together – whether they like it or not.

The series follows the relationship between two people from two completely different worlds, and how they make their relationship work. During this process, the two families strove to come to terms with the inevitability of being "joined" by their children's union, which would force both sides to revisit their preconceptions and prejudices.

Production 
The show was created by Chuck Ranberg and Anne Flett-Giordano. In January 2003, the project received a pilot order at ABC, albeit untitled. Reid Scott was the first cast on March 5, 2003. The next day, Maggie Lawson was cast, shortly following her leading role on the ABC pilot Nancy Drew. John Benjamin Hickey was cast on March 21, 2003. On March 31, 2003, Christopher Sieber was cast; Sieber had previously starred in another ABC sitcom Two of a Kind. Lenny Clarke was cast on April 9, 2003.

The pilot was picked up by ABC on May 12, 2003, now with the title It's All Relative. The series premiered on ABC on October 1, 2003. The pilot earned a total of 10.2 million viewers. The series was picked up for a full 22-episode season on October 31, 2003.

Despite initial high ratings, and airing between My Wife and Kids and The Bachelor, the series' ratings soon slid, especially as it had to compete against 60 Minutes Wednesday and American Idol on Wednesdays. In February 2004, ABC put the series on hiatus, before a move to Tuesdays in March 2004. The rescheduling worsened ratings, now competing against more established and popular series: established Top 50 series 24, The Guardian and Scrubs, and critical favorites America's Next Top Model and One Tree Hill. After two episodes in the new timeslot, the series was abruptly pulled from ABC's schedule on April 8, 2004, with the final two scheduled episodes left unaired. On May 17, 2004, ABC announced at their annual upfronts that it had cancelled It's All Relative.

For the 2003–04 television season, the series placed #57 overall, with an average of 8.6 million viewers.

Cast and characters

Main 
 Reid Scott as Bobby O'Neill:
The son of Mace and Audrey, and Liz' fiancée. Bobby may not be the brightest or the most hard-working, but he still loves Liz, and is willing to overlook their vast differences to be with her. Bobby works at his family's bar. He and Liz met at a Vermont ski resort, after she sprained her ankle on a "bunny slope", and he took her back to the lodge. When he and Liz announce their engagement, they move into Philip and Simon's guest house.
 Maggie Lawson as Liz Stoddard-Banks:
The adoptive daughter of Philip and Simon, and Bobby's fiancée. Liz is a smart, outgoing, somewhat-spoiled but well-meaning, Harvard student. Her mother died when Liz was still a baby, and Philip and Simon – her best friends – adopted and raised Liz. Despite being adopted, Liz has much in common with both her dads- she has Philip's need for organization and order, but Simon's need to relax and have fun (although it usually involves things most would not find fun). Liz met Bobby when she sprained her ankle on a bunny slope at a Vermont skiing lodge. She was raised Episcopalian.
 Lenny Clarke as Mason "Mace" O'Neill:
Bobby's Irish Catholic father and Audrey's husband, as well as the owner of the family bar. Mace is a typical Irish Catholic patriarch: he frequently drinks beer, won't change his viewpoint or choices for others, and wants his son to marry a Catholic girl. Mace and Philip both disapprove of Bobby and Liz' relationship, and hate each other as well. Mace will frequently call Philip and Simon various demeaning names, such as "Pixie Sticks" or "The Notorious G.A.Y.". In the first part of the series, Mace is extremely homophobic; however, these tendencies were suppressed as the show went on (although he does still continue to call them names). When Mace does not get his way, he usually yells "Fine!" and walks away.
 Harriet Sansom Harris as Audrey O'Neill (née Corrigan):
Bobby's mother and Mace's wife, who helps him run the bar. Audrey only wants the best for Bobby and Maddy, and her desires and decisions usually conflict with Mace's. Although Audrey is at first on the same page with Mace regarding the Stoddard-Banks family, she eventually warms up to Simon. Later episodes also show Audrey gaining more confidence in herself and her beliefs and desires.
 John Benjamin Hickey as Philip Stoddard:
Liz's adoptive father, who serves as the patriarch of the Stoddard-Banks family. Philip is portrayed as an effeminate, OCD-ridden art gallery owner. Philip has several phobias and ticks that usually annoy the others (especially Mace and Simon), such as: having different napkins for spills and eating, not allowing Liz and Simon to get dogs due to their "filthiness" (even going as far as lying to both of them for many years about having a terrible allergy), etc. Like Mace disapproves of the relationship between Bobby and Liz, Philip is also the more vocal one of the couple of his disapproval; he is usually saying insults (and sometimes trying) to get Bobby and Liz broken-up. A running gag on the series is Philip's three-times divorced mother, Lillian, an overbearing woman who causes both Philip and Simon grief, and is on her fourth marriage to a millionaire in Florida.
 Christopher Sieber as Simon Banks:
Liz' adoptive father, who serves as the matriarch of the Stoddard-Banks family. Simon is a third-grade teacher, who is portrayed as more masculine than Philip, although he usually takes care of more of the household chores, such as cooking. However, Philip is also very much more laid-back than Philip. Like Audrey, Simon is also on the same page as Philip when Bobby and Liz reveal their engagement; however, he eventually warms up to Audrey. Simon was born and raised in Minnesota, and was in a one-hit 1980's boy band called "Cross My Heart" (as "Simon Sez"). A running gag in the series are mentions to Simon's "wild" past and string of exes.
 Paige Moss as Maddy O'Neill:
Bobby's younger sister, who is a waitress at the bar. Maddy is a sassy, ditsy, promiscuous gold-digger, who is the most open-minded about Liz and her family (although she does find Liz too boring). Maddy frequently says ignorant comments, such as "Man, daddy, if you would've been gay, my life would have been so much better." Her dimness is usually made fun of by the other characters, especially Bobby and Mace. Maddy has hooked up with many guys, but is usually only interested in pursuing a relationship with rich men (but only for their money). She was held back in the third grade.

Notable guest stars 
 Victor Garber as Joffrey (episode: "The Doctor Is Out")
 James Patrick Stuart as Charlie Carson (episode: "Swangate")
 Olympia Dukakis as Colleen O'Neill, Mace's mother (episode: "Thanks, But No Thanks")
 Ed McMahon as himself (episode: "And Our Sauce, It Is a Beauty")
 Ed Quinn as Brad, Simon's bandmate and ex-boyfriend (episode: "Cross My Heart")
 Kevin Chamberlin as Wayne, Simon's bandmate (episode: "Cross My Heart")
 Brooke Burke-Charvet as Park Ranger (episode: "Who's Camping Now")
 Darby Stanchfield as Jordan F., one of Liz' friends who Maddy fights with (episode: "Who's Camping Now")
 Andy Richter as Dr. Bob, a TV psychologist who Audrey likes (episode: "Philip in a China Shop")
 Stephen Tobolowsky as Roy, a fellow fan of Dr. Bob (episode: "Philip in a China Shop")
 Marisa Miller as herself (episode: "Philip in a China Shop")
 Tom Bosley as Father Joseph, the priest at the O'Neill's parish (episode: "Fight for Your Invite to Party")

Episodes

Reception

Critical 
The series received negative reviews from critics.

Ratings

References

External links 
 

2000s American sitcoms
2003 American television series debuts
2004 American television series endings
2000s American LGBT-related comedy television series
American Broadcasting Company original programming
American LGBT-related sitcoms
English-language television shows
Gay-related television shows
Television series about families
Television series about marriage
Television series by CBS Studios
Television series by ABC Studios
Television shows set in Boston